Franklin County is located in the Blue Ridge foothills of the Commonwealth of Virginia. As of the 2020 census, the population was 54,477. Its county seat is Rocky Mount. Franklin County is part of the Roanoke Metropolitan Statistical Area and is located in the Roanoke Region of Virginia. The Roanoke River forms its northeast boundary with Bedford County.

History 

The Blue Ridge Foothills had long been inhabited by Native Americans. At the time of European encounter, mostly Siouan-speaking tribes lived in this area.

A few colonists moved into the area before the American Revolutionary War, but most settlement happened afterward, as people moved west seeking new lands. Cultivation of tobacco had exhausted soils in the eastern part of the state. The county was formed in 1785 from parts of Bedford and Henry counties.  It was named for Benjamin Franklin. The Piedmont and backcountry areas were largely settled by Scots-Irish, who were the last major immigrant group from the British Isles to enter the colonies before the Revolutionary War. There were also migrants from coastal areas, including free people of color, who moved to the frontier to escape racial strictures associated with the slave society of Virginia.

The Great Moonshine Conspiracy era
In the 20th century during Prohibition, local wits named Franklin County the "Moonshine Capital of the World", as moonshine production and bootlegging drove the economy. As of 2000, the local chamber of commerce had adopted the title as a heritage identification for the area.  Moonshine is still being made in the area.

Historians estimate that in the 1920s, 99 of every 100 Franklin County residents were in some way involved in the illegal liquor trade. The bootleggers became involved with gangsters from Chicago and other major cities, and some local law enforcement officials were part of the criminal activities and killing of competitors. "Between 1930 and 1935 local still operators and their business partners sold a volume of whiskey that would have generated $5,500,000 in excise taxes at the old 1920 tax rate."

A lengthy federal investigation resulted in indictments and trials for 34 suspects in 1935 for what was called the "Great Moonshine Conspiracy," which attracted national attention. The writer Sherwood Anderson was among the many outsiders who came to cover the trial. At what was then the longest trial in state history, 31 people were convicted, but their jail sentences were relatively light (two years or less). Thirteen conspirators were sentenced only to probation.

This period has recently received new attention by writers. T. Keister Greer's history The Great Moonshine Conspiracy Trial of 1935 (2002) covered the trial and its background in the county.  The writer Matt Bondurant had ancestors in the area, whose exploits during this period inspired his historical novel, The Wettest County in the World (2008). (The title was based on a statement by Anderson.) The book was adapted as a film, Lawless, in 2012. In 2014 an historical novel with much history about the county and town came out: "Moonshine Corner, Keys to Rocky Mount," , by the widow of T. Keister Greer, Ibby Greer.

Late 20th century to present
Since the 1980s, much residential development has occurred around Smith Mountain Lake. People live there who commute to work in the urbanized areas of Roanoke, Lynchburg, Martinsville, and Danville. Retirees have also moved in, and both groups have increased the county's population.

Geography
It is upriver of the fall line of the Roanoke River, located at Roanoke Rapids, North Carolina.

Districts 
The county is divided into supervisor districts; a few are: Blackwater, Blue Ridge, Boones Mill, Gills Creek, Rocky Mount, Snow Creek, Union Hall, Ferrum, Glade Hill, Penhook, and Callaway

Adjacent counties 
 Bedford County, Virginia — northeast
 Pittsylvania County, Virginia — southeast
 Henry County, Virginia — south
 Patrick County, Virginia — southwest
 Floyd County, Virginia — west
 Roanoke County, Virginia — northwest

National protected areas
 Blue Ridge Parkway (part)
 Booker T. Washington National Monument

Major highways
  (future)

Demographics

2020 census

Note: the US Census treats Hispanic/Latino as an ethnic category. This table excludes Latinos from the racial categories and assigns them to a separate category. Hispanics/Latinos can be of any race.

2000 Census
As of the census of 2000, there were 47,286 people, 18,963 households, and 13,918 families residing in the county. The population density was 68 people per square mile (26/km2). There were 22,717 housing units at an average density of 33 per square mile (13/km2). The racial makeup of the county was 88.95% White, 9.35% Black or African American, 0.19% Native American, 0.36% Asian, 0.02% Pacific Islander, 0.42% from other races, and 0.71% from two or more races. 1.21% of the population were Hispanic or Latino of any race.

There were 18,963 households, out of which 29.10% had children under the age of 18 living with them, 60.10% were married couples living together, 9.40% had a female householder with no husband present, and 26.60% were non-families. 22.60% of all households were made up of individuals, and 8.90% had someone living alone who was 65 years of age or older. The average household size was 2.44 and the average family size was 2.84.

In the county, the population was spread out, with 22.20% under the age of 18, 8.10% from 18 to 24, 28.20% from 25 to 44, 27.20% from 45 to 64, and 14.30% who were 65 years of age or older. The median age was 40 years. For every 100 females there were 97.20 males.  For every 100 females age 18 and over, there were 96.30 males.

The median income for a household in the county was $38,056, and the median income for a family was $45,163. Males had a median income of $29,807 versus $22,215 for females. The per capita income for the county was $19,605. About 7.30% of families and 9.70% of the population were below the poverty line, including 12.70% of those under age 18 and 9.80% of those age 65 or over.

Government

Board of supervisors
 Blackwater District: Ronald Mitchell
 Blue Ridge District: Timothy Tatum (R)
 Boone District: R.A. "Ronnie" Thompson (R)
 Gills Creek District: Lorie Smith (R)
 Rocky Mount District: Mike Carter (I)
 Snow Creek District: Nicholas "Nick" Mitchell (I)
 Union Hall District: Tommy Cundiff (I)

Constitutional officers
 Clerk of the Circuit Court: Teresa J. Brown (I)
 Commissioner of the Revenue: Margaret Stone Torrence (I)
 Commonwealth's Attorney: Cooper Brown
 Sheriff: W.Q. "Bill" Overton Jr. (I)
 Treasurer: Susan J. Wray

Franklin is represented by Republicans David Suetterlein and Bill Stanley in the Virginia Senate, Republicans Wren Williams and Kathy Byron in the Virginia House of Delegates, and Morgan Griffin in the U.S. House of Representatives.

Education
Franklin County Public Schools operates public schools serving the county. The school system includes 12 elementary schools, one middle school, and one high school.

Middle School - Benjamin Franklin Middle School(BFMS), VA

High School - Franklin County High School(FCHS), VA

About four miles outside of Callaway is the Phoebe Needles Mission School, an Episcopal mission school dating from 1907. The school and mission church were used to serve the rural and mountain children of the county who could not get to the public schools in Callaway, Ferrum, or Rocky Mount. The school has now become a church parish, Center for Lifelong Learning and summer camp operated by the Episcopal Diocese of Southwestern Virginia.

Ferrum College was established in 1913. Ferrum College offers bachelor's degrees in twenty-eight major degree programs. The college continues to operate under the auspices of the Virginia Annual Conference of the United Methodist Church and the United Methodist Women of the Virginia Annual Conference.

Communities

Towns
 Boones Mill
 Rocky Mount

Census-designated places
 Ferrum
 Henry Fork
 North Shore
 Penhook
 Union Hall
 Westlake Corner

Other unincorporated communities
 Burnt Chimney
 Callaway
 Glade Hill
 Hale's Ford
 Naff
 Redwood
 Snow Creek
 Wirtz

Notable people
 Jubal Anderson Early, Confederate general
 Booker T. Washington, a freedman (former slave) who became a leading educator and one of the prominent civil rights activists of his era, was born on the Burroughs Farm in Hale's Ford.
 Adam Clayton Powell Sr. (1865–1953), a prominent Baptist minister nationally, was born to Sally Dunning, a free woman of color whose family had been free for at least three generations before the Civil War. He worked his way through Wayland Seminary and graduate school at Yale University. After working in New Haven, he was called to the Abyssinian Baptist Church in Harlem, New York from 1908 to 1936, which he developed as the largest congregation in the US at the time, reaching 10,000 members.
 Bondurant Brothers; Howard, Forrest and Jack, were bootlegging brothers during the Prohibition Era from the Snow Creek Area of Franklin County. They are the main characters in Matt Bondurant's historical novel, The Wettest County in the World (2008), and in the film adapted from it, Lawless (2012).
 Ron Hodges, Major League Baseball catcher who played his entire career for the New York Mets from 1973 to 1984.
 Dwaine Board, National Football League Defensive Lineman and now Cleveland Browns defensive line coach was part of four Super Bowl victories for the San Francisco 49ers, three as a player (Super Bowl XVI, Super Bowl XIX, and Super Bowl XXIII) and one as a coach (Super Bowl XXIX). As a player Board recorded 61.0 career sacks and eight more in the postseason from 1979 to 1988. He earned Defensive Player of the Game honors in San Francisco's 38–16 win over Miami.
 Jesse L. Martin, actor, primarily known for his role as Detective Ed Green on the TV show Law & Order.
Tarell Basham, National Football League outside linebacker for the Dallas Cowboys

In popular culture

 Franklin County is the setting for Matt Bondurant's historical novel, The Wettest County in the World (2008) set in the Prohibition era, featuring his grandfather and two great-uncles among the bootleggers.
 Franklin County is featured in the film Lawless (2012), adapted from the novel in a screenplay by Nick Cave. It is directed by John Hillcoat.
 Franklin County, and subsequently Smith Mountain Lake, was the setting for Touchstone Pictures 1991 film "What About Bob?". The comedy film was directed by Frank Oz, and starred Bill Murray and Richard Dreyfuss. Murray plays Bob Wiley, a psychiatric patient who follows his egotistical psychiatrist Dr. Leo Marvin (Dreyfuss) on vacation. When the unstable Bob befriends the other members of Marvin's family, it pushes the doctor over the edge.
 Franklin County is the setting for Rebecca Ore's novella, Alien Bootlegger.

See also
 National Register of Historic Places listings in Franklin County, Virginia

References

External links
 Franklin County government official website
 Rocky Mount official website
 The Franklin News Post (Local News Paper)

 
1785 establishments in Virginia
Virginia counties